Anodontia is a genus of bivalves belonging to the family Lucinidae.

The genus has a cosmopolitan distribution.

Species
The following species are recognised in the genus Anodontia:
 

Anodontia alba 
Anodontia conili 
Anodontia edentuloides 
Anodontia gentili 
Anodontia parnensis 
Anodontia renulata 
Anodontia spherica 
Anodontia thalmani 
Anodontia waharoaenis

References

Lucinidae
Bivalve genera